Quirosella is a genus of glass snails that is endemic to Rennell Island, Solomon Islands.

Species
 Quirosella coultasi Clench, 1958
 Quirosella knudseni Clench, 1958
 Quirosella wolffi Clench, 1958

References

 Clench, W.J. (1958). The land and freshwater mollusks of Rennell Island, Solomon Islands. Natural History of Rennell Island, British Solomon Islands. 2 (27): 155-202, 4 plates.
Vol. III. Trochomorphidae and systematical review of all other families. Ancona: L'Informatore Piceno. 160 pp
 Bank, R. A. (2017). Classification of the Recent terrestrial Gastropoda of the World. Last update: July 16th, 2017.

Helicarionidae
Gastropod genera